The Crucial Line is the debut album of Long Island rock band BulletProof Messenger and was self released in October 2006. The album was recorded and engineered by Matt Litwin, Voley Martin and Bob Stander and mastered by Tony Dawsey at Masterdisk in New York, NY.

Track listing
Music by Matt Litwin and Voley Martin. Lyrics by Matt Litwin, Voley Martin, and Marcus Klavan.

Personnel
 Marcus Klavan - Vocals
 Matt Litwin - Turntables/Programming/Beats/Guitar
 Voley Martin - Guitar/Bass/Drums
 Alex Straiter - Drums

References

BulletProof Messenger albums
2006 debut albums